This is a list of diplomatic missions of Northern Cyprus. The Turkish Republic of Northern Cyprus (TRNC) is recognized only by Turkey, and  consequently has only one embassy with de jure recognition, along with six consulate-generals. However this has not prevented the TRNC authorities from opening representative offices elsewhere. Legally the two representative offices in the United States are in the status of commercial entities and the staff do not have diplomatic visas.

Americas

Asia

Europe

Multilateral organisations
 New York City (TRNC Office to the United Nations)

See also
Foreign relations of Northern Cyprus
List of diplomatic missions in Northern Cyprus

References

External links
 Ministry of Foreign Affairs of the Turkish Republic of Northern Cyprus (English and Turkish)

 
Northern Cyprus
Diplomatic missions
Northern Cyprus